The General Confederation of Free Workers of Cameroon (CGTLC) is a trade union centre in Cameroon.

It was formed in March, 2003 by Benoît Essiga, a former president of the Confederation of Cameroon Trade Unions.

References

Trade unions in Cameroon
Trade unions established in 2003
2003 establishments in Cameroon